Chez Piggy is a restaurant in downtown Kingston, Ontario.

History
Chez Piggy was opened in 1979 by Zal Yanovsky of the 1960s pop group The Lovin' Spoonful and his partner Rose Richardson, who were both avid travellers who enjoyed good food  and wanted to create a restaurant reflecting those traits. The restaurant is located in a formerly abandoned limestone horse stable that was built in 1806. Now a popular culinary tourist attraction, the restaurant is recognized as a local landmark. Zoe Yanovsky took over as operating owner of both Chez Piggy and Pan Chancho when her father died in 2002.

The current Member of Provincial Parliament for Kingston and the Islands, Ian Arthur, served as the executive chef at Chez Piggy until his election to the provincial legislature in 2018.

Awards
In 2015 it was named Kingston's best-known restaurant by the National Post. In 2016, it received the Ontario Hostelry Institute (OHI) Gold Award.

References

Restaurants in Ontario
Companies based in Kingston, Ontario
Restaurants established in 1979